Jean Lambert-wild is a White Clown  The white clown is one of the oldest art forms of clowning. He is the origin of the clown. He is distinguished by his dignified posture, his white makeup and always shimmering costumes. The expression white clown is a pleonasm to distinguish it from other clownish forms such as Augustus.
Jean Lambert-wild is also theatre-maker born in 1972 in Réunion. He was the artistic director of Theatre de l'Union – Centre Dramatique National du Limousin, and the director of L'Académie de l'Union, Ecole Nationale Supérieure de Théâtre du Limousin. Despite numerous letters of support he resigned from his position in November 2020 after facing accusations of mistreatment and harassment from the theater staff .
Since January 2021,  he is the artistic director of the coopérative 326.

Biography

Early life 

In 1979, his father, who was a livestock farmer, created the farming cooperative Sica Révia. In 2012, the cooperative was composed of 323 livestock farmers. As a child, Jean Lambert-wild experienced the creation of this cooperative as an initiatory event, which mythology continues to influence several of his projects. He moved Lyon in 1990 and started a BA in Philosophy at Lyon III University. It is there that André Arcellaschi, his Latin lecturer, incited him to direct plays by Plautus, Seneca the Younger and Gombrowicz. He considered joining the Merchant Navy, but shortly before saw a production of Chekhov's Three Sisters by German director Matthias Langhoff. This production had a strong impact on Lambert-wild, who realised that theatre was the medium that would give him the freedom he had been looking for.

Positions in French public institutions 
In 2007, he was appointed director of Comédie de Caen – Centre Dramatique National de Normandie by the French Ministry of Culture, a role he retained until 31 December 2014.

The Comédie de Caen's mission involves enabling the creation and production of new work, and several of the shows it produces go on to tour nationally and internationally. As part of its mission, the institution also supports independent French and foreign theatre companies. The location of the Comédie de Caen, in the Normandy region, allowed Lambert-wild to further his efforts in developing non-Parisian audiences, in an attempt to make culture more accessible.

Since 1 January 2015, he is the director of Théâtre de l’Union, Centre Dramatique National du Limousin and of L’Académie, École Nationale Supérieure de Théâtre du Limousin, appointed by the French Ministry of Culture.

In November 2020 he was suspended from his position after the whole staff of the theater accused him of mismanaging and harassment in a public letter sent to the French Ministry of Culture. He decided to resign a month later.

As a director and scenographer

Ecmnesia 

 1990 : Grande lessive de printemps - Première Confession de l'Hypogée (Great Spring Clean – First Confession of the Hypogeum), a show by Jean Lambert-wild, Espace 44 in Lyon.
 1992 :1992 : La Naissance de la paix (The Birth of Peace) by René Descartes, a show by Jean Lambert-wild and Groupe 3, Lyon 3 University.
 1992 : Yvonne, princesse de Bourgogne  (Ivonia, Princess of Burgundia) by Witold Gombrowicz, a show by Jean Lambert-wild and Groupe 3 Lyon 3 University.
 1993 :1993 : Les Bacchides (Bacchides) by Plautus, a show by Jean Lambert-wild and Groupe 3, Lyon 3 University.
 1994 : Les Troyennes (Trojan Women) by Seneca the Young,  a show by Jean Lambert-wild and Groupe 3, Lyon 3 University.
 1997 : 1997 : Aquarium (Fish Tank), based on Olly's Prison (Maison d'arrêt) by Edward Bond, a show by Jean Lambert-wild, Café de l'Harmonie, Lyon.
 1997 : V versus w, a show by Jean Lambert-wild, Café de l'Harmonie, Lyon.
 1998 : Paradis (Paradise), a show by Jean Lambert-wild, Café de l'Harmonie, Lyon.
 1999 : Splendeur et lassitude du Capitaine Marion Déperrier, Épopée en deux Époques et une Rupture (Splendor and Lassitude of Captain Marion Deperrier, Epic in two periods and a break), written by Jean Lambert-wild, Le Granit - Scène Nationale de Belfort.
 2001 : Orgia by Pier Paolo Pasolini, a show by Jean Lambert-wild and Jean-Luc Therminarias, Théâtre National de la Colline, Paris.
 2001 : Le Terrier (Der Bau), by Franz Kafka, a show by Jean Lambert-wild, Le Granit, scène Nationale de Belfort.
 2002 : Spaghetti's Club, a show by Jean Lambert-wild and Jean-Luc Therminarias, created at La Filature, Scène Nationale de Mulhouse. Performed at MC93 in Bobigny, following work in progress showings in Bulgaria and Berlin.
 2003 : Crise de nerfs - Parlez-moi d'amour, Deuxième Confession de l'Hypogée (Fits of Hysterics – Tell Me About Love, Second Confession of the Hypogeum), a show by Jean Lambert-wild and Jean-Luc Therminarias, Avignon Festival, 2003.
 2005 : Mue, Un discours de Sereburã, accompagné d'un rêve de Waëhipo Junior et des mythes de la communauté Xavante d'Etênhiritipa, Première Mélopée de l'Hypogée, (Sloughing, A Speech by Sereburã with a dream by Waëhipo Junior and the myths of the Xavante community from Etênhiritipa, First Threnody of the Hypogeum), a show by Jean Lambert-wild and Jean-Luc Therminarias, created at the Castle of Saumane, as part of the Avignon Festival 2005.
 2005 : Nous verrons bien (We'll See), a show by Jean Lambert-wild, Contre-Courant Festival, Avignon.
 2006 : Sade Songs, A tale by Jean-Rémy Guédon, Stéphane Blanquet and Jean Lambert-wild, Allan, Scène Nationale de Montbéliard.
 2007 : A corps perdu (Heart and Soul), and Arrêt sur Image (Freeze Frame), two shows by Jean Lambert-wild, Petit-Colombier, Comédie Française, followed by a tour in West Africa.
 2008 : Le Malheur de Job (Job's Misfortune), a show by Jean Lambert-wild, Jean-Luc Therminarias, Dgiz, Jérôme Thomas and Martin Schwietzkze, Comédie de Caen - Centre Dramatique National de Normandie.
 2009 : Ro-Oua ou le peuple des rois (Ro-oua, or The People of the Kings), a show by Jean Lambert-wild, Contre-Courant Festival, Avignon.
 2009 : Le Recours aux forêts (The Retreat to the Forests), a show by Jean Lambert-wild, Jean-Luc Therminarias, Michel Onfray, Carolyn Carlson and François Royet, Comédie de Caen - Centre Dramatique National de Normandie as part of Les Boréales Festival, * 2009.
 2010 : Comment ai-je pu tenir là-dedans ? (How Was I Ever Able To Live In there?), based on La Chèvre de Monsieur Seguin (The Goat of Monsieur Seguin) by Alphonse Daudet, a tale by Stéphane Blanquet and Jean Lambert-wild, Comédie de Caen - Centre Dramatique National de Normandie. Nominated for the Molière Awards 2010, in the category "Jeune Public" (Family Entertainment).
 2010 : La Mort d'Adam - Deuxième Mélopée de l'Hypogée, (The Death of Adam – Second Threnody of the Hypogeum), a show by Jean Lambert-wild, Jean-Luc Therminarias, François Royet and Thierry Collet, Avignon Festival, 2010.
 2011 : L'Ombelle du Trépassé (The Deceased's Umbel), a show by Jean Lambert-wild and Yann-Fañch Kemener, Maison de la Poésie, Paris.
 2011 : Nazarov le Trimardeur - Le miel, (Nazarov le Trimardeur – Honey) a show by Jean Lambert-wild and Stéphane Pelliccia, Comédie de Caen - Centre Dramatique National de Normandie.
 2012 : War Sweet War, a show by Jean Lambert-wild, Jean-Luc Therminarias, Stéphane Blanquet and Juha Marsalo, Comédie de Caen - Centre Dramatique National de Normandie.
 2012 : La Sagesse des abeilles, Première leçon de Démocrite, (The Wisdom of Bees, The First Lesson of Democritus ), a show by Jean Lambert-wild, Jean-Luc Therminarias, Michel Onfray, Lorenzo Malaguerra and François Royet, Comédie de Caen - Centre Dramatique National de Normandie.
 2012 : Mon amoureux noueux pommier, (My Lover Gnarled Apple Tree), a tale by Jean Lambert-wild and Stéphane Blanquet, Théâtre national de Chaillot.
 2013 : L'armoire du Diable (The Devil's Wardrobe), a show by Jean Lambert-wild, created with the permanent company of the National Theatre of Hungary in Budapest (Hungary).
 2013 : Nazarov le trimardeur - Mon œuf, (Nazarov le Trimardeur – My Egg) a show by Jean Lambert-wild and Stéphane Pelliccia, Comédie de Caen - Centre Dramatique National de Normandie.
 2014 : En attendant Godot, (Waiting for Godot) by Samuel Beckett, directed by Jean Lambert-wild, Marcel Bozonnet and Lorenzo Malaguerra, Comédie de Caen.
 2014 : Splendeur et Lassitude du Capitaine Iwatani Izumi, (Splendor and Lassitude of Captain Iwatani Izumi), a show by Jean Lambert-wild, Keita Mishima and Akihito Hirano, Shizuoka Performing Arts Center, Shizuoka (Japan).
 2015 : Richard III - Loyaulté Me Lie, based on Richard III by William Shakespeare, a show by Jean Lambert-wild, Lorenzo Malaguerra, Stéphane Blanquet, Élodie Bordas and Jean-Luc Therminarias, co-production Autumn 2015, in France / Switzerland / Belgium / USA / Quebec .
 2016 : Roberto Zucco, de Bernard-Marie Koltès, a show by Jean Lambert-wild and Lorenzo Malaguerra, Myeongdong Theater, Séoul (Korea), September 2016, Théâtre de l'Union - Centre Dramatique du Limousin
 2018 : Yotaro au pays des Yôkais, a show by Jean Lambert-wild & Lorenzo Malaguerra, Shizuoka Performing Arts Center à Shizuoka (Japon).
 2019 : Dom juan ou le Festin de Pierre, a show by Jean Lambert-wild & Lorenzo Malaguerra, Théâtre de l'Union - Centre Dramatique du Limousin

Calentures 

 Coloris vitalis, Calenture No.1 of the Hypogeum, create at Theatre de l'Union, Limoges, in collaboration with trente-trente festival 2018 
 Ægri Somnia, Calenture No.2 of the Hypogeum, created for the Georges Rigal public swimming-pool, Paris. Collaboration with Théâtre National de la Colline, 2002.
 Mon corps à la patrie, tes cendres au Panthéon, (My Body to the Homeland, Your Ashes to the Pantheon) Calenture No.3 of the Hypogeum, Avignon Festival, 2004.
 Aphtes (Mouth Ulcers), Calenture No.4 of the Hypogeum, Espace Gantner de Bourognes (Territoire de Belfort), 2000.
 Car Je de Je, Calenture no 11  of the Hypogeum, French College of Singapour, Singapour, May 2017
 Déclaration de Guerre, Calenture no 14  of the Hypogeum, Open Studio – Atelier de Paris CDNC Paris, June 2014
 My story is not a loft, Calenture No.17 of the Hypogeum, Avignon Festival, 2005.
 In Memoriam in spem, Calenture n° 18 de l'Hypogée, Chartreuse de Villeneuve-les-Avignon, 1998
 Mon Savoureux (You, Delicious), Calenture No.20 of the Hypogeum, Le Granit, Scène Nationale de Belfort, 2006.
 Climat, Calenture n°26 of the Hypogeum, Domaine d'O, Montpellier, 2012
 Le Mur (The Wall), Calenture No.27 of the Hypogeum, IRCAM – Paris, 2002.
 Dédicace (Book Signing), Calenture No.29 of the Hypogeum, La Chartreuse, Avignon Festival, 2002.
 Sourions au vent, Calenture N°36  of the Hypogeum, Etênhiritipa, 2003.
 Faites-le taire! (Shut Him Up!), Calenture No.41 of the Hypogeum, Festival des Escales Improbables, Montreal, Canada, 2006.
 Petites peaux de confiture (Little Jars, A Skin of Jam), Calenture No. 47 of the Hypogeum, Usine C, Montréal, 2012.
 Éjaculation (Ejaculation), Calenture No.54 of the Hypogeum, Belfort, 2004.
 Un clown à la mer, Calenture n°55  of the Hypogeum pour acteur, grand col bleu, pompon rouge et rêve de longue route, création à Limoges en 2018
 Pour la Saint-Valentin, Calenture N°56 of the Hypogeum, Théâtre de l’Union – Centre Dramatique du Limousin, 2017.
 Le labyrinthe du Cicérone (The Cicerone's Labyrinth), Calenture No.59 of the Hypogeum, Hôtel de Soubise, Paris, in collaboration with visual artist Milene Guermont, 2012.
 Comme disait mon père (Like My Father Used To Say), Calenture No.65 of the Hypogeum, published by Les Solitaires Intempestifs, 2009.
 Ma mère ne disait rien (My Mother Never Said Anything), Calenture No.66 of the Hypogeum, published by Les Solitaires Intempestifs, 2009.
 Car cœur sur la bouche, Calenture no 69 of Hypogeum, creation at Lasalle College of the arts, Singapour May 2017
 L'arbre à pyjamas (The Pyjama Tree), Calenture No.76 of the Hypogeum, Domaine d'Ô, Montpellier, 2012.
 Vagabondages, Calenture n°78 of the Hypogeum, Singapour, 2018
 Tête à tête (Tête-à-Tête), Calenture No.88 of the Hypogeum, Le Granit-Scène Nationale de Belfort, in collaboration with UTBM, 2003.
 Migraine, Calenture N°92 of the Hypogeum, Granit - Scène Nationale de Belfort, April 2003
 In Blood we trust, Calenture No.97 of the Hypogeum, Avignon Festival, 2010.
 Spectres de Printemps, Calenture n°111 of the Hypogeum, French College of Singapour, May 2017
 Space out space, zero gravity flight, Calenture No.113 of the Hypogeum, created with the CNES, Bordeaux-Mérignac Airport, 2013.
 Remember and don't forget to play, Calenture No.145 of the Hypogeum, Festival des Escales Improbables, Montreal, 2006.
 Noyade (Drowning), Calenture No.201 of the Hypogeum, Festival des Escales Improbables, Montreal, 2006.
 Le clown des Marais, Calenture n°225 of the Hypogeum, Voilah ! Festival à Singapour, 2016
 Le clown du ruisseau, Calenture n°226 of the Hypogeum, French College of Singapour May 2017
 Le clown du rocher, Calenture n°227 of the Hypogeum, La route du Sirque festival, Nexon, August 2017
 Le temps perdu (Lost Time), Calenture No.256 of the Hypogeum, Comédie de Caen, 2012.
 L’impossible retour, Calenture N°324 of the Hypogeum, forest of Lann er Heric, 2019 
 Chantons sous la mort (Singing In Death), Calenture No.325 of the Hypogeum, Festival des Escales Improbables, Montreal, 2006.

As a scenographer  
Jean Lambert-wild did the scenography for all his works for the stage, both the Ecmnésie and the Calentures, but he also worked as a scenographer on the following projects :
 1997 : Vater Land, Vater Land, by Jean-Paul Wenzel, a show by Philippe Goyard, Le Granit, Scène Nationale de Belfort.
 1998 : Combat de Nègres et de Chiens (Black Battles With Dogs), by Bernard-Marie Koltès, a show by Philippe Goyard, Le Granit, Scène Nationale de Belfort.
 2014 : Babel, After the war by Xavier Dayer and Alberto Manguel, a show by Lorenzo Malaguerra, Théâtre de Vevey.

As an actor 
Since 1997, he has performed in each of the Calentures (see list of the Calentures), but he also play as an actor on the followings projects : 
 1992 : In Yvonne, princesse de Bourgogne (Ivona, Princess of Burgundia), by Witold Gombrowicz, which he also directed, Groupe 3, Theatre Society of Lyon III University.
 1993 : In Les Troyennes (Trojan Women) by Seneca the Young, which he also directed, Groupe 3, Theatre Society of Lyon III University.
 1996 : In L'île du salut (The Salvation Island), based on La colonie pénitentiaire (In The Penal Colony) by Franz Kafka, directed by Matthias Langhoff, Théâtre de la Ville, Paris.
 1997 : In V versus W, l’Impossible retour (The Impossible Return) et Migraine (Migraine), based on his own writings. Created with his first theatre company, L’écharpe rouge, based in Lyon.
 2005 : In Mue, a show by Jean Lambert-wild and Jean-Luc Therminarias. Created at the Avignon Festival.
 2010 : In La Mort d’Adam (The Death of Adam) written and directed by Jean Lambert-wild, premiere at the Avignon Festival.
 2013 : He is the voice of Georges Chapman, in Clinique d'un roi, directed by Antoine Pickels.
 2014 : He plays the role of Lucky in En attendant Godot (Waiting for Godot) by Samuel Beckett, a show by Jean Lambert-wild, Marcel Bozonnet and Lorenzo Malaguerra. Created at National Dramatic Center of Normandy
 2016 : He plays Richard III in his adaptation of Shakespeare's eponymous play, Richard III - Loyaulté Me Lie, based on Richard III by William Shakespeare. Created at Theatre de l'Union - National Dramatic Center of Limousin
 2018 : He plays the role of "Death" in "Frida, Jambe de bois", premiere at Crochetan's Theater, by Ovale's Company.
 2019 : He plays the role of Dom Juan in Dom juan ou le Festin de Pierre. National Dramatic Center of Limousin
 2019 : He plays the role of Zizi Souflette in Les Cocottes en Sucettes, directed by Lorenzo Malaguerra, premiere at Crochetan's Theater, by Ovale's Company.

Published work 

 1998 : Splendeur et lassitude du Capitaine Marion Déperrier, published by Les Solitaires Intempestifs
 2003 : Crise de nerfs - Parlez-moi d'amour suivi de Ægri Somnia, published by Les Solitaires Intempestifs
 2005 : Mue - Première Mélopée - Un discours de Sereburã accompagné d'un rêve de Waëhipo Junior et des mythes de la Communauté Xavante d'Etênhiritipa, published by Les Solitaires Intempestifs
 2005 : Se Tenir Debout, Entretiens avec Mari-Mai Corbel, published by Les Solitaires Intempestifs
 2009 : Spectres de Printemps, Collection Nervium, (Comédie de Caen - Centre Dramatique National de Normandie)
 2009 : Demain le Théâtre: songes épars dans l'attente, published by Les Solitaires Intempestifs
 2009 : Comme disait mon père, suivi de Ma mère ne disait rien, Calentures no 65 et no 66, published by Les Solitaires Intempestifs
 2009 : Le théâtre comme lieu où raconter l'Espace, in Espace, CNES, published by l'Observatoire de l'Espace
 2010 : La Mort d'Adam - Deuxième Mélopée (book + DVD) published by Les Solitaires Intempestifs
 2011: L'Ombelle du Trépassé (Accompagné de chants Bretons recueillis par Yann-Fanch Kemener) published by Les Solitaires Intempestifs
 2012 : Ghost dance - Collection Nervium (Comédie de Caen - Centre Dramatique National de Normandie)
 2012 : Addresse à l'ami, in Le Manifeste Hédoniste, published by Michel Onfray's  Autrement 
 2012 : Ghost Dance - Remugles épars dans l'attente, and L’œil que je suis, in Frictions No.2021
 2012 : L'Ombelle du Trépassé (book + CD) published by Les Solitaires Intempestifs
 2013 : Tout allait mieux autrefois, même l'avenir, in Frictions No.2122
 2014 : Space Out Space, in Espace, CNES, Éditions de L'Observatoire de l'Espace
 2014 : Déclaration de guerre, in Ces cris gravés, Éditions du Chameau
 2015 : Aux frontières du Royaume, in Frictions No.24 23
 2015 : L'Armoire du diable, Une fable librement inspirée de contes tziganes, published by Les Solitaires Intempestifs,
 2015 : La stratégie de la bicyclette, préface de la revue Frictions "Critique dramatique et alentours" rédigée par Jean-Pierre Han 
 2015 : A poetic experience of the world, dans la revue "Imagine 2020 - art and climat change - There is Nothing" rédigée par Claudia Galhos aux éditions Art in site. 
 2016 : Richard III - Loyaulté me lie, suivi d'un essai de Raymond Geuss : Richard III, déchirement tragique et rêve de perfection. aux éditions Les Solitaires Intempestifs
 2016 : Discours d'Alexandrie, Revue Frictions n°26 - Printemps 2016
 2016 : La force atomique du fait divers, Revue Frictions n°27 - Hiver 2016
 2017 : Car cœur sur la bouche, extraits de poèmes, revue Catastrophes, revue électronique d'écritures contemporaines - August 2017
 2017 : Mon amoureux noueux pommier, (Livre CD), Éditions Les Solitaires intempestifs, décembre 2017.

Discography 

 Drumlike in salty bathtub - 326 Music CD326001
 Spaghetti's Club - "Le point de vue de Lewis Caroll" - 326 Music CD326005
 Spaghetti's Club - "La Conclusion" - 326 Music CD326009
 L'Ombelle du Trépassé - 326 Music CD326013
 Mon Amoureux noueux pommier - 326 Music CD 326014

Awards and nominations 

 1996 : Awarded an "Aide à l'écriture dramatique" grant (Grant for Playwriting), by the French Ministry of Culture, for Splendeur et Lassitude du Capitaine Marion Déperrier.
 2000 : Awarded a "Villa Médicis Hors les Murs" grant (USA) to research and write Spaghetti's Club - "Le point de vue de John Cage" (Spaghettis’ Club – "John Cage's Point of View").
 2009 ; CNL's writers grant to write Tête perdue au fond de l'Océan - Première Mélopée (A Head Lost At The Bottom Of The Sea – First Threnody).
 2010 : Nominated for a Molière Award, in the category "Jeune Public" (Family Entertainment), with the show Comment ai-je pu tenir là dedans (How Was I Ever Able to Live In There?), based on La Chèvre de Mr Seguin (The Goat of Monsieur Seguin) by Alphonse Daudet24
 2014 : Appointed Knight of the Ordre des Arts et des Lettres by the French Ministry of Culture and Communication

Further reading 
 Phenomena, Cahiers de l’Espace, Espace Gantner 1999 /
 Jean Lambert-wild – La scénographie high-tech, par Anne-Marie Lercher, revue L’Œil n°|533, février 2002 
 Le Théâtre ? Une coopérative d’artistes par Lucille Garbagnati, revue Coulisses n°|25, janvier 2002 
 Al Dente par Hervé Pons, revue Mouvements n° 24, novembre 2002 
 Anges et chimères du virtuel par Corinne Pencenat, revue d’études esthétiques, 2002 /
 Vers un théâtre des interfaces par Otto Sholtz, revue d’études esthétiques, 2002 / 
 Le théâtre comme art de la dépossession par Jean-Yves Lazennec, revue d’études théâtrales, Revue Registres n°8 2004  /( ) 
 L’art numérique par Edmond Couchot et Norbert Hilaire, Éditions Flammarion 2003 (- 105) /
 Le réel, paradis perdu, par Mari-Mai Corbel, revue Mouvement n°20, mars-avril 2004  
 Autour de Jacques Polieri : Scénographie et technologie, par Michel Corvin et Franck Ancel, Éditions de la BNF 2004 /() 
 Énergie du Grotesque – Crise de nerfs – Parlez-moi d’amour par Mari-Mai Corbel, revue Coulisses, n°30, mai 2004 /()
 Jean Lambert-wild par Chantal Boiron, Revue UBU – Scènes d’Europe n°|32, juillet 2004  
 Un théâtre d’auteur – L’univers de Jean Lambert-wild par Corinne Pencenat, Théâtre Public n°174, juillet-September 2004   
 Œuvres à plusieurs, par Richard Conte, revue Plastik Automne 2004 / 
 Environnements virtuels et nouvelles stratégies actantielles par Valérie Morignat, in Études théâtrales (n°|30) /2004 - Arts de la scène, scène des arts. Vol. III / 
 Formes hybrides : vers de nouvelles identités, textes réunis par Luc Boucris et Marcel Freydefont, avec la collaboration d’Anne Wibo. Actes du colloque des 4 et 5 décembre 2003, organisé par le Centre d’études du XXe de l’Université Paul-Valéry (Montpellier III). Publication : École d’architecture de Nantes - Centre d’études théâtrales de Louvain /
 Une techno-poétique par Mari-Mai Corbel, Revue Coulisses (n°|33), décembre 2004 /()
 Scientifiques de l’égarement par Judith Martin, Alternatives théâtrales, n°85-86 avril 2005 /
 La Culture pour qui ? par Jean-Claude Wallach, Éditions de l’attribut, mars 2007 /
 Internet, un seisme dans la culture ? par Marc Le Glatin, Éditions de l’attribut, juin 2007 / 
 La mise en scène contemporaine par Patrice Pavis, Éditions Armand Colin 2008 /
 L’écriture à Avignon (2010) : vers un retour de la narration ? par Patrice Pavis, The IATC webjournal, 2010 /   
 Manifeste Hédoniste par Michel Onfray, Éditions Autrement, avril 2011 / 
 L’Acteur et l’intermédialité. Les nouveaux enjeux pour l’interprète et la scène a l’ère technologique par Izabella Pluta, Édition L’Âge d’homme 2012 /
 Théâtre du XXI siècle : Commencent par Jean-Pierre Ryngaert et Julie Sermon, Éditions Armand Colin juillet 2012 /  
 Raconter des Histoires – Quelle narration au théâtre aujourd’hui ? par Arielle Meyer, MacLeod et Michèle Pralong, Éditions Métis Presses avril 2012 /
 Bande-dessinée, animation, spectacle vivant par Sidonie Han, Revue Registres n°16 / 2013 /
  Le metteur en scène et ses doubles, actes du colloque au Grü/Trasnstheater à Genève, Éditions Métis Presses novembre 2012  
 La sainte apocalypse de Jean par Michel Onfray –préface de l’ombelle du trépassé /
 Scènes étrangères – War sweet war – Uspieni- Endormis, Izabella Pluta, Édition de la revue polonaise Teatr, 2013 / 
 Yann-Fañch Kemener – chant de vision de Sophie Denis, Éditions Vivre tout simplement 2013.
 Pour un Théâtre multimédiums - Dans la brochure Regard sur les rencontre Nationales THEMAA 2013,  édité en décembre 2014  par l'association THEMAA dans le cadre des rencontres sciences et marionnettes.
 La scène circulaire aujourd'hui, ouvrage dirigé par Romain Fohr et Guy Freize, Éditions L'entretemps, Avril 2015.
 Noir, Lumière et théâtralité, Véronique Perruchon, éditions Septentrion,Presses Universitaires, 2016
 L'étoffe des rêves - chronique d'une aventure théâtrale, film documentaire écrit et réalisé par François Royet autour de la création du spectacle Richard III - Loyaulté me lie. Diffusion sur France 3 Limousin lundi 11 avril 2016.
 Metteur en scène aujourd'hui - Identité artistique en question ? Ouvrage dirigé par Izabella Pluta et Gabrielle Girot Éditions Presses Universitaires de Rennes, 2017
 Fuites – Première tentative- short film written by Jean Lambert-wild, directed by François Royet, 2018, November.
 Les dessous de Frida  - documentary film written and directed by Christian Berrut, 2019, June.

External links

Notes & references 

1972 births
Living people
French theatre directors
20th-century French dramatists and playwrights
21st-century French dramatists and playwrights
Chevaliers of the Ordre des Arts et des Lettres